Felimida krohni is a species of colorful sea slug, a dorid nudibranch, a marine gastropod mollusc in the family Chromodorididae. This species occurs in European waters (from France to the Canary Islands) and in the Mediterranean Sea (Greece). The specific name krohni was in honour of Russian zoologist August David Krohn.

Description
The colouring is quite variable; the basic colour is pink, mauve or purple with an iridescent border of pale blue or mauve and an outer border of yellow. The dorsal surface bears three longitudinal, white or yellow lines, sometimes continuous and sometimes interrupted and usually slightly raised. These unite at the posterior end near where the purple branchial plumes project from the surface forming a ring around the anus. There is often a pattern of yellow spots between the lines. At the anterior end, the rhinophores are deep purple and lamellar, with 12 to 20 gills. Both rhinophores and branchial plumes can be retracted if the animal is disturbed.

Distribution
Felimida krohni is native to the eastern Atlantic Ocean and the Mediterranean Sea. In the Atlantic Ocean its range extends from the British Isles as far south as Cape Verde.

Ecology
Felimida krohni feeds on sponges in the genus Ircinia, or sometimes on the crumb-of-bread sponge (Hymeniacidon sanguinea), grinding off fragments with its radula; the bright colours and conspicuous appearance of these nudibranchs comes from the pigments and toxins they sequester from the sponge tissues, and indicate to potential predators that they are distasteful, an example of aposematism. Nudibranchs are hermaphrodites, having a set of both male and female reproductive organs. A pair will line up with their right sides adjacent, and each pass a spermatophore (bundle of sperm) to the other. The eggs are laid in a gelatinous spiral on the substrate, some time between April and September. The larvae are planktonic.

References

Further reading 

 Gofas, S.; Le Renard, J.; Bouchet, P. (2001). Mollusca, in: Costello, M.J. et al. (Ed.) (2001). European register of marine species: a check-list of the marine species in Europe and a bibliography of guides to their identification. Collection Patrimoines Naturels, 50: pp. 180–213 
 Debelius, H. & Kuiter, R.H. (2007) Nudibranchs of the world. ConchBooks, Frankfurt, 360 pp.  page(s): 183
 Johnson R.F. & Gosliner T.M. (2012) Traditional taxonomic groupings mask evolutionary history: A molecular phylogeny and new classification of the chromodorid nudibranchs. PLoS ONE 7(4): e33479

Chromodorididae
Molluscs of the Atlantic Ocean
Molluscs of the Mediterranean Sea
Gastropods described in 1846